The Gamblers is a 1970 American drama film directed by Ron Winston and starring Suzy Kendall, Don Gordon and Pierre Olaf. Its plot involves a confidence trickster who goes for a trip of a luxury cruise liner, where he is himself conned out of his money. It is loosely based on Fyodor Dostoyevsky's 1866 novel The Gambler. Its alternative title was Kockari.

Cast
 Suzy Kendall – Candace
 Don Gordon – Rooney
 Pierre Olaf – Cozzier
 Kenneth Griffith – Broadfoot
 Stuart Margolin – Goldy
 Richard Woo – Koboyashi
 Massimo Serato – Del Isolla
 Faith Domergue – Signora Del Isolla
 Relja Bašić – Yakov
 Anthony Chinn – Nono

See also
 List of American films of 1970

References

External links

1970 films
1970 comedy-drama films
American comedy-drama films
Films based on The Gambler
Films scored by John Morris
Films set in Yugoslavia
Films about gambling
1970s English-language films
Films directed by Ron Winston
1970s American films